Ługowiska  is a village in the administrative district of Gmina Choceń, within Włocławek County, Kuyavian-Pomeranian Voivodeship, in north-central Poland.

The village has a population of 150.

References

Villages in Włocławek County